The Red Bull RB7 is a Formula One racing car designed by the Red Bull Racing team for the 2011 Formula One season. It was driven by defending champion Sebastian Vettel and Australian driver Mark Webber. The car was launched at the Circuit Ricardo Tormo in Valencia, Spain on 1 February 2011. Sebastian Vettel was the first driver to test the car.

The car was fastest throughout Barcelona testing with Vettel at the wheel. It won the first race of the season at Melbourne with Vettel, whilst Webber finished fifth. In the nineteen races of the 2011 season, the RB7 only failed to finish in the top five twice, when Mark Webber crashed out of the 2011 Italian Grand Prix and when Sebastian Vettel retired from the 2011 Abu Dhabi Grand Prix.

Vettel used the RB7 to claim the 2011 World Drivers' Championship in Japan and Red Bull won the World Constructors' Championship the following weekend in South Korea. The car achieved three 1-2 finishes during the season. It is one of the most dominant Formula One cars ever built, winning 12 of the 19 races and claiming all but one pole position in the 2011 season, in part due to the innovative but controversial exhaust-blown diffuser.

Sebastian Vettel, who (since joining Scuderia Toro Rosso) makes a habit of naming his cars, named his RB7 chassis Kinky Kylie.

The Red Bull RB7 was the first Red Bull car to assume Renault full-works team partnership status after the Renault F1 Team was rebranded to Lotus Renault GP and later Lotus F1 Team following Renaults sale of their 25 percent stake in the team to Lotus Cars in late 2010. The RB7 was also the first-ever KERS-equipped Formula One car to win the constructors' title.

On 4 February 2023, the Red Bull RB7 was used by New Zealand Formula 2 driver Liam Lawson to make a demonstration lap of the Mount Panorama race track in between practice and qualifying sessions for the 2023 Liqui Moly Bathurst 12 Hour.

Complete Formula One results 
(key) (results in bold indicate pole position; results in italics indicate fastest lap)

References

External links 

Red Bull Formula One cars
Formula One championship-winning cars